13th Congress may refer to:

 13th Congress of the Philippines (2004–2007)
 13th Congress of the Russian Communist Party (Bolsheviks) (1924)
 13th National Congress of the Chinese Communist Party (1987)
 13th National Congress of the Kuomintang (1988)
 13th National People's Congress (2018–present)
 13th United States Congress (1813–1815)